Fiaz Ahmad Anjum Jandran (born January 1, 1970 in Mandi Bahauddin, Pakistan) is a Pakistani lawyer and jurist. He is a Judge at the Islamabad High Court.

Education 
Jandran attended Board of Intermediate and Secondary Education where he obtained his First School Certificate in 1987. He then attended University of the Punjab where he matriculated in 1989. In 1994, he obtained his LLB degree from the University of the Punjab. He later got a master's degree in history from the same university.

Career 
Fiaz started his career in 1995 as an advocate and then subsequently became a Member of Islamabad District Bar Association. In 1997 he was appointed an advocate for the Islamabad High Court.  In 2010, he became an Advocate of Supreme Court of Pakistan. Prior to his appointment as Judge he was the Vice-Chairman of Islamabad Bar Council, Chairman Legal Education Committee and Member of the Commission of Legal Education, as constituted by the Supreme Court of Pakistan.

On December 13, 2020 he was appointed Judge at the Islamabad High Court.

References 

Living people
Pakistani judges
Judges of the Islamabad High Court
1970 births